Bowthorpe is a village near Norwich, England.

Bowthorpe may also refer to:

Places
Bowthorpe, a deserted medieval village near Toft, Lincolnshire, England
Bowthorpe Oak
Bowthorpe, a hamlet near Menthorpe in North Yorkshire (until 1974 in the East Riding), England

People with the surname
Jack Bowthorpe (1905–1978), British businessman
Simon Bowthorpe (born 1964), British dressage rider